Si vive una volta sola is a 2021 Italian comedy film directed by Carlo Verdone.

The film is written by Verdone himself, together with Giovanni Veronesi and Pasquale Plastino, and its release has been delayed three times from an original February 2020 date due to the COVID-19 pandemic. The film was released on Prime Video in Italy on May 13, 2021.

Cast
Carlo Verdone as Umberto Gastaldi
Rocco Papaleo as Amedeo Lasalandra
Anna Foglietta as Lucia Santilli
Max Tortora as Corrado Pezzella
Mariana Falace as Tina Gastaldi
Sergio Múñiz as Xabier

Release
Originally set to be released on 27 February 2020, the date was delayed to 27 November due to the outbreak of the COVID-19 pandemic in Italy. In October 2020, after the Italian government imposed the closure of theaters in the whole country, in order to decrease the impact of a new outbreak, Filmauro pushed back the release to 20 January 2021. The film was delayed again and finally released in a selection of theatres in Rome on 28 April 2021, and via streaming on Amazon Prime Video on 13 May.

References

External links

2021 films
Films directed by Carlo Verdone
Italian comedy films
2020s Italian-language films
Films postponed due to the COVID-19 pandemic
2021 comedy films
2020s Italian films